Billman may refer to:

 Billman, person who uses a bill (weapon)
 Billman (surname)
 Billman Creek Formation, geologic formation